Laura Kobayashi is a violinist and teacher currently living in northern Virginia. She has performed in orchestras, chamber groups, and as a soloist.

Career

Education 
Laura Kobayashi is a graduate of the Juilliard School, having studied under Dorothy DeLay. She went on to Yale University for her graduate degree and in 1995 received her Doctor of Musical Arts from the University of Michigan.

Chamber music 
Kobayashi has been a part of many chamber groups, including the Kobayashi/Gray Duo with pianist Susan Keith Gray. Kobayashi also plays in the Polaris Piano Trio and the Main Street Chamber Players in Fairfax, Virginia.

Teaching 
Kobayashi is one of the founding members of the Main Street Music Studios in Fairfax, Virginia, where she also teaches.

Kobayashi/Gray Duo 
In 1993 the Kobayashi/Gray Duo won the USIA Artistic Ambassador audition, which led them touring through South America and the West Indies. The duo is known for playing music of 19th-21st century women composers. The mission of the group is to find and play new and lost music by women composers. The duo has shared their experiences at the American String Teachers Association conventions, the International Festival of Women Composers, and other important meetings.

Awards 
Laura Kobayashi has received many awards including the VASTA (Virginia State Chapter of ASTA) Outstanding String Teacher Award and the Excellence in Teaching Award by the Division of Music and College of Creative Arts at West Virginia University.

Performances 
One of Kobayashi's more recent performances was at Northern State University where the Kobayashi/Gray duo performed in Krikac Auditorium in April 2018. As a member of the Polaris Piano Trio Kobayashi performed on November 4, 2018. The performance consisted of chamber works by Beethoven, Mendelssohn and David Baker.

Albums

Feminissimo! Women Playing Music by Women 
In 2008 the Kobayashi/Gray Duo released an album titled Feminissimo! Women Playing Music by Women. The album consists of nine Romantic and contemporary works, four of which are premiered works written by women composers Elisenda Fábregas, Emma Lou Diemer, Anna Priscilla Risher, and Signe Lund. The music on the album has a wide range of heritages, including Spanish, French, Norwegian, American, Polish, and Czech. The album includes many special composers including Florence Beatrice Price (1887-1953), whose symphony was the first to be performed by a major orchestra as a woman African-American composer. Price's piece on the album is titled The Deserted Garden and can be described as sounding like a hymn.

References

External links 
 Laura Kobayashi at Main Street Music Studios
 Kobayashi-Gray Duo
 Polaris Piano Trio
 

Year of birth missing (living people)
Living people
Juilliard School alumni
University of Michigan School of Music, Theatre & Dance alumni
Yale University alumni
20th-century classical violinists
20th-century American women musicians
21st-century classical violinists
21st-century American women musicians
Albany Records artists
20th-century American violinists
21st-century American violinists